Anna Balletbó i Puig (born 15 December 1943) is a Spanish academic, journalist and politician. She was a member of the Spanish Socialist Workers' Party.

Early life and education
Balletbò was born in Barcelona on 15 December 1943. His aunt was the grandmother of football manager Pep Guardiola.

Balletbò attended a boarding school in England where she studied the English language. She attended a journalism institute in Spain. She is a graduate of the University of Barcelona where she received a degree in educational sciences. She also obtained a degree in modern history and communication sciences from the Autonomous University of Barcelona.

Career and activities
Following her graduation worked as a pre-school teacher for seven years. Then she started her journalistic career being a regular contributor of the newspaper El Correo Catalán. Then she began to work for BBC.

In 1979 she was elected as a deputy from Barcelona for the Spanish Socialist Workers' Party. Her tenure at the Congress of Deputies ended in 2000.

She worked as a faculty member at the Autonomous University of Barcelona from 1975 and became a professor at the faculty of information sciences. She was part of the Woodrow Wilson International Center for Scholars. She is also cofounder of the Olof Palme International Foundation which was established in Barcelona in 1989. Balletbò has been the head of the organization.    

Balletbò has published various books and articles.

Awards
Balletbò received the Swedish decoration Order of the Polar Star in 1985 and the Catalan decoration Creu de Sant Jordi in 2006.

References

External links

20th-century Spanish women politicians
1943 births
Living people
Members of the 1st Congress of Deputies (Spain)
Politicians from Barcelona
Spanish Socialist Workers' Party politicians
University of Barcelona alumni
Autonomous University of Barcelona alumni
Academic staff of the Autonomous University of Barcelona
20th-century Spanish women writers
21st-century Spanish women writers
Women members of the Congress of Deputies (Spain)
Members of the 2nd Congress of Deputies (Spain)
Members of the 3rd Congress of Deputies (Spain)
Members of the 4th Congress of Deputies (Spain)
Members of the 5th Congress of Deputies (Spain)
Members of the 6th Congress of Deputies (Spain)
20th-century Spanish journalists
Order of the Polar Star